The meridian 133° west of Greenwich is a line of longitude that extends from the North Pole across the Arctic Ocean, North America, the Pacific Ocean, the Southern Ocean, and Antarctica to the South Pole.

The 133rd meridian west forms a great circle with the 47th meridian east.

From Pole to Pole
Starting at the North Pole and heading south to the South Pole, the 133rd meridian west passes through:

{| class="wikitable plainrowheaders"
! scope="col" width="130" | Co-ordinates
! scope="col" | Country, territory or sea
! scope="col" | Notes
|-
| style="background:#b0e0e6;" | 
! scope="row" style="background:#b0e0e6;" | Arctic Ocean
| style="background:#b0e0e6;" |
|-
| style="background:#b0e0e6;" | 
! scope="row" style="background:#b0e0e6;" | Beaufort Sea
| style="background:#b0e0e6;" |
|-valign="top"
| 
! scope="row" | 
| Northwest Territories — passing through Tuktoyaktuk Yukon — from  British Columbia — from 
|-valign="top"
| 
! scope="row" | 
| Alaska — Alaska Panhandle (mainland), Kupreanof Island, Woewodski Island, Zarembo Island, Thorne Island, Prince of Wales Island and Dall Island
|-
| style="background:#b0e0e6;" | 
! scope="row" style="background:#b0e0e6;" | Pacific Ocean
| style="background:#b0e0e6;" |
|-
| 
! scope="row" | 
| British Columbia — Langara Island, Graham Island and Hippa Island
|-
| style="background:#b0e0e6;" | 
! scope="row" style="background:#b0e0e6;" | Pacific Ocean
| style="background:#b0e0e6;" |
|-
| style="background:#b0e0e6;" | 
! scope="row" style="background:#b0e0e6;" | Southern Ocean
| style="background:#b0e0e6;" |
|-
| 
! scope="row" | Antarctica
| Unclaimed territory
|-
|}

See also
132nd meridian west
134th meridian west

w133 meridian west